Senefelderplatz is a Berlin U-Bahn station located on the  line.

The station is situated under Senefelderplatz, named after the inventor of the printing technique of lithography, Alois Senefelder.

The station was designed by Alfred Grenander and opened in 1913. The grey tiles on the walls are still not covered with advertisements. In November 1943, this station was heavily damaged twice - entrance and the ceiling penetration.

References

U2 (Berlin U-Bahn) stations
Buildings and structures in Pankow
Railway stations in Germany opened in 1913